The Serbian Armed Forces is the military of Serbia.

The President of Serbia acts as commander-in-chief of the armed forces, while administration and defence policy is carried out by the Government through the Ministry of Defence. The highest operational authority, in-charge of the deployment and preparation of the armed forces in peace and war, is the General Staff.

Military service is voluntary, though conscription may occur in wartime. As of 2023, Serbia is ranked 58 of 140 out of the countries considered for the annual GFP review.

The Serbian Armed Forces consists of two branches: Serbian Army and Serbian Air Force and Air Defence.

History

Serbia has a long military tradition dating to early medieval period. The modern Serbian military dates back to the Serbian Revolution which started in 1804 with the First Serbian Uprising against the Ottoman occupation of Serbia. The victories in the battles of Ivankovac (1805), Mišar (August 1806), Deligrad (December 1806) and Belgrade (November–December 1806), led to the establishment of the Principality of Serbia in 1817. The subsequent Second Serbian Uprising of 1815–1817 led to full independence and recognition of the Kingdom of Serbia and weakened the Ottoman dominance in the Balkans. In November 1885 the Serbo-Bulgarian War occurred following Bulgarian unification and resulted in a Bulgarian victory. In 1912 the First Balkan War (1912–1913) erupted between the Ottoman Empire and the Balkan League (Serbia, Greece, Montenegro and Bulgaria). Balkan League victories in the Battle of Kumanovo (October 1912), the Battle of Prilep (November 1912), the Battle of Monastir (November 1912), the Battle of Adrianople (November 1912 to March 1913), and the Siege of Scutari (October 1912 to April 1913) resulted in the defeat of the Ottoman Empire, which lost most of its remaining Balkan territories per the Treaty of London (May 1913). Shortly after, the Second Balkan War (June to August, 1913) broke out when Bulgaria, dissatisfied with the division of territory, declared war against its former allies, Serbia and Greece. Following a string of defeats, Bulgaria requested an armistice and signed the 1913 Treaty of Bucharest, formally ending the war.

Serbia's independence and growing influence threatened neighboring Austria-Hungary which led to the Bosnian crisis of 1908–09. Consequently, from 1901, all Serbian males between the ages of 21 to 46 became liable for general mobilization. Following the assassination of Archduke Franz Ferdinand of Austria in June 1914, Austria-Hungary implicated Serbians and declared war on Serbia (July 1914), which marked the beginning of the First World War of 1914–1918. Serbian forces repelled three consecutive invasions by Austria in 1914, securing the first major victories of the war for the Allies, but were eventually overwhelmed by the combined forces of the Central Powers (October–November 1915) and forced to retreat through Albania (1915–1916) to the Greek island of Corfu (1915–1916).

Serbian military activity after World War I took place in the context of various Yugoslav armies until the break-up of Yugoslavia in the 1990s and the restoration of Serbia as an independent state in 2006.

Organisation
The Serbian Armed Forces are commanded by the General Staff corp of senior officers. The general staff is led by the Chief of the General Staff. The chief of the general staff is appointed by the President who is the Commander-in-Chief. The current Chief of the General Staff is General Milan Mojsilović.

Service branches
The armed forces consist of the following service branches:
 Serbian Army 
 Serbian Air Force and Air Defence

Serbian Army

The Serbian Army (Kopnena vojska Srbije - KoV) is the land-based and the largest component of the armed forces consisting of: infantry, armoured, artillery, engineering units as well as River Flotilla. It is responsible for defending the sovereignty and territorial integrity of Serbia; participating in peacekeeping operations; and providing humanitarian aid and disaster relief.

Serbian Air Force and Air Defence

The Serbian Air Force and Air Defence (Ratno vazduhoplovstvo i protivvazduhoplovna odbrana Vojske Srbije - RViPVO) is the aviation and anti-aircraft defence based component of the armed forces consisting of: aviation, anti-aircraft, surveillance and reconnaissance units. Its mission is to guard and protect the sovereignty of Serbian airspace, and jointly with the Army, to protect territorial integrity.

Command structure
Command structure of the Serbian Armed Forces is centered around General Staff as the highest command authority, and three separate commands: one for each of the branches (Army Command and Air Force and Air Defence Command) and one responsible for training (Training Command).

General Staff

The Serbian General Staff (Generalštab Vojske Srbije) makes strategic and tactical preparations and procedures for use during peacetime and war. Special forces (63rd Parachute Brigade and 72nd Brigade for Special Operations) are under direct command of the Chief of the General Staff. Organizational units of the Armed Forces subordinated to the General Staff are: Guard, Signal Brigade, Central Logistics Base, 224th Center for Electronic Action, Technical Testing Center, Peacekeeping Operations Center, as well as the Directorate of Military Police (which includes Criminal Investigative Group and Detachment of the Military Police for Special Operations "Cobras").

Army Command
Army Command (Komanda Kopnene vojske) is responsible for unitary, administrative and operational control of the Army. Army Command headquarters is in Niš.

Air Force and Air Defence Command
Air Force and Air Defence Command (Komanda Ratnog vazduhoplovstva i protivvazduhoplovne odbrane) is responsible for unitary, administrative and operational control of the Air Force and Air Defence. Its headquarters is in Zemun.

Training Command
The Training Command (Komanda za obuku) is responsible for providing basic and  specialist training for soldiers, non-commissioned officers and officers of Serbian Armed Forces as well the members of foreign armies.

Equipment

The Serbian Armed Forces has a wide variety of equipment, mix of older Yugoslav and Soviet products (dating back to the 1980s and even 1970s) and new equipment, either domestically-produced from Serbian defence contractors or acquired from foreign producers (main suppliers being Russia, France, China, and to a lesser extent Germany).

Inventory of Serbian Army includes: 232 tanks (30 Russian T-72 B1MS and 212 Yugoslav-made M-84), 90 self-propelled howitzers (18 domestically-produced Nora B-52 and 72 Soviet-made Gvozdika), 60 Yugoslav-made M-77 Oganj MRLs, 320 Yugoslav-made BVP M-80 infantry fighting vehicles, 36 domestically-produced Lazar armoured personnel carriers, over 100 MRAPs and other armoured vehicles (including 30 domestically-produced Miloš) as well as 18 pieces of domestically-produced PASARS-16 short-range air-defence missile system (armed with total of 50 French Mistral 3 missiles).

Serbian Air Force and Air Defense has in operational use the following equipment: 14 Soviet-made MiG-29 fighter aircraft (11 of which are modernized to SM standard and armed with R-77 missiles), 12 Yugoslav-made J-22 attack aircraft, 1 Soviet-made An-26 transport aircraft, 4 (and 4 more on order) Russian Mi-35 attack helicopter (armed with Ataka missiles), 13 Russian Mi-17 utility helicopters, 5 (and 10 more on order) German H145M utility helicopters, 6 Chinese CH-92 combat drones, 4 batteries of Chinese HQ-22 long-range air-defence missile system, one battery (and 2 more on order) of Russian Pantsir medium-range air-defence missile system.

In last several years Serbia has embarked on ambitious programme of equipment modernisation and acquisition. Whenever possible, the Serbian Ministry of Defence favors products that are manufactured in Serbia such as: Lazar armoured personnel carriers, Miloš light armored infantry vehicles, Nora B-52 artillery systems, Lasta 95 training aircraft. Largest procurement of foreign equipment recently included: Chinese HQ-22 air-defence missile system, Airbus H145M utility helicopters, Russian Mi-35 attack helicopters as well as various missile acquisitions (French surface-to-air Mistral for PASARS vehicles; Russian R-77 air-to-air BVR missiles for MiG-29 fighter aircraft, Ataka air-to-surface missiles for Mi-35 attack helicopters and Kornet man-portable anti-tank guided missiles).

Significant acquisitions of military equipment are also planned in the near future: 2 Airbus C-295 transport aircraft (due to be delivered by the end of 2023), French Thales long-range Ground Master 400 and short-range Ground Master 200 air defence mobile radar systems (to be delivered in 2022 and 2023) and Russian long-range Krasukha and short-range Repellent Patrol mobile electronic warfare systems. Recently it was also announced the intention of purchase of 12 new French Rafale multirole fighter aircraft with the aim of replacing MiG-29 which will be in service until the end of the 2020s.

Personnel
The Serbian Armed Forces are composed entirely of professionals and volunteers following the suspension of mandatory military service in 2011.

Active personnel
There are 22,500 active members: 4,200 officers, 6,500 non-commissioned officers, 8,200 active-duty soldiers and 3,500 civilians in volunteer military service. It breaks down as follows:
 General Staff (including attached units: special forces brigades, Guard, Signal Brigade, Logistics, etc.):  4,300
 Army Command: 13,200
 Air Force and Air Defence Command: 3,000
 Training Command: 2,300

Reserve force
The reserve force is composed of an active reserve and passive (i.e. war-time) reserve. The active reserve forces have 2,000 members and they are generally required to perform  45 days of military service per year. They are assigned to one of four reserve territorial brigades (Banat Brigade, Belgrade Brigade, Timok Brigade and Rasina Brigade), each having active HQ, command company and logistics company predicted for rapid deployment in case of war. The passive reserve totals about 600,000 citizens of age 18–49 with past military training or experience and is activated only in the events of war.

Traditions

Motto
Motto of the Serbian Armed Forces is "For Freedom and Honour of the Fatherland" (Za slobodu i čast Otadžbine) and is found  on uniforms as well as on brigade flags.

Armed Forces Day
Serbian Armed Forces Day (Dan Vojske Srbije) is marked on 23 April, the anniversary of the Second Serbian Uprising. On that day in 1815, in Takovo, prominent elders met and decided to start the fight for liberation of Serbia from the Turkish authorities, which eventually led to the free and independent Serbia.

Marches

The Serbian military was the first to pioneer the high-step as a military step. It is similar to the goose step, with the difference being that the knee is bent at the top of the arc. It was used by the Royal Yugoslav Army and at the time was called the "male step". The Yugoslav People's Army abandoned it after World War II, being in use for over two decades before being replaced by high-stepping in the 1975 Victory Day Parade, to assert itself as independent from Soviet influence. High-stepping is still used today by Serbian Armed Forces, and is also utilized by the militaries of North Macedonia and Bosnia and Herzegovina.

March Music
There are several marches in use in Serbian Armed Forces. The standard one is Parade March (Paradni marš), while the Guard uses its own Guard March (Gardijski marš) as standard march music. Also frequently used and the most popular and recognizable by the general public in Serbia is famous Drina March (Marš na Drinu). Other frequently used march is Vojvoda Stepa Stepanović March (Marš vojvode Stepe Stepanovića).

Deployments
The Serbian Armed Forces actively take part in numerous multinational peacekeeping missions.

See also
 Military history of Serbia
 Military ranks of Serbia

Citations

References

External links

 
 Ministry of Defence
 Official recruitment site

Military of Serbia